Minnesota State Highway 274 (MN 274) was a  highway in southwest Minnesota, which ran from Wood Lake and continued north to an intersection with MN 23 near Granite Falls.

Route description
MN 274 served as a north–south highway in southwest Minnesota between Wood Lake and Granite Falls. It was also known as 550th Street in Yellow Medicine County. The highway passed around the west side of Wood Lake near the town of Wood Lake.The roadway crossed the Yellow Medicine River near its intersection with CSAH 3.

History
MN 274 was authorized on July 1, 1949. The route of the highway was paved in 1950.

The highway's original northern terminus was at MN 67 until MN 23 was rerouted between Hanley Falls and Granite Falls circa 1980.

MN 274 became part of MN 67 north of CSAH 2, and the section south of CSAH 2 was turned back on September 27, 2022.

Major intersections

References

External links

Highway 274 at the Unofficial Minnesota Highways Page

274
Transportation in Yellow Medicine County, Minnesota